George Peterson may refer to:

 George N. Peterson, Jr. (born 1950), member of the Massachusetts House of Representatives
 George Peterson (Medal of Honor) (died 1945), U.S. Army soldier and Medal of Honor recipient
 George P. "Bud" Peterson, President of the Georgia Institute of Technology and ex-chancellor of the University of Colorado at Boulder
 George Peterson (pirate)
 Georg Peterson, Swedish long-distance runner